Sir John Arthur Pilcher GCMG (16 May 1912 – 10 February 1990) was a British diplomat, capping a long career with a posting as Her Majesty's ambassador to the Philippines (1959–1963), Austria (1965–1967) and Japan (1967–1972).

Career

Educated at Shrewsbury, Pilcher's entered the consular service after passing an open examination in 1935.

His career in the Foreign Service was marked by appointment as one of His Majesty's Vice-Consuls in China in 1940.

Pilcher was the British ambassador to the Philippines 1959–63, and to Austria 1965–67 when the Queen conferred with the honour of Knight Commander in the Order of St Michael and St George. 
 
Pilcher ended his career as Her Majesty's ambassador in Tokyo from 1967 through 1972, He was considered by some of his peers as "the last of the scholar-diplomats."<ref>Cortazzi, Hugh. (2004).  [http://www.globaloriental.co.uk/book.asp?Title_ID=7 British Envoys in Japan,1859-1972, publisher's blurb.] </ref>

Although Pilcher was appropriately diplomatic in his professional duties, he was capable of extraordinary frankness in dispatches sent to Whitehall. While there is no doubt that Pilcher was sincere, his seeming inability to recognize an inherent double standard in his views is revealing about the attitude that many British and European scholars took towards non-Europeans in the early postwar decades. For instance, the substance of a declassified 1972 letter to the Foreign Secretary Sir Alec Douglas-Home was published in the Japan Times'' in 2003.  In that dispatch, Pilcher expressed views which are no less controversial today than when he wrote them.  

His granddaughter Marissa Pilcher married to German Prince Maximilian zu Bentheim-Tecklenburg.

Honours
 Order of St Michael and St George, Knight Grand Cross.

See also
 List of Old Salopians
 List of Ambassadors from the United Kingdom to Austria
 List of Ambassadors from the United Kingdom to Japan
 Trilateral Commission

Notes

References
 Cortazzi, Hugh. (2004).  British Envoys in Japan,1859-1972. London: Global Oriental.
 . (2001).  Japan Experiences: Fifty Years, One Hundred Views : Post-war Japan Through British Eyes 1945-2000. London: Routledge. 
 Daniels, Gordon.  Summary of microfilmed records: Part 7: Complete Files for 1969-1971 (PRO Class FCO 21/555-593 et seq.).  Foreign Office Files for Japan and the Far East; Series Two: British Foreign Office Files for Post-war Japan, 1952-1980 (Public Record Office Classes FO 371 and FCO 21). Marlborough, Wiltshire: Adam Matthew Publications.
 .   Summary of Microfilmed records: Part 6: Complete Files for 1966-1968 (PRO Classes FO 371/187076-187142 & FCO 21/238-299). Foreign Office Files for Japan and the Far East; Series Two: British Foreign Office Files for Post-War Japan, 1952-1980 (Public Record Office Classes FO 371 and FCO 21)
PILCHER, Sir John (Arthur), Who Was Who, A & C Black, 1920–2008; online edn, Oxford University Press, Dec 2007, Retrieved 24 July 2012

1990 deaths
1912 births
20th-century British diplomats
Ambassadors of the United Kingdom to the Philippines
Ambassadors of the United Kingdom to Austria
Ambassadors of the United Kingdom to Japan
British diplomats in East Asia
Knights Grand Cross of the Order of St Michael and St George
People educated at Shrewsbury School